Palm Springs station is a train station in the Garnet community of Palm Springs, California, United States, served by Amtrak, the national railroad passenger system. The Sunset Limited and the Texas Eagle, combined, provide a thrice-weekly service in each direction.

This is not a full-service station. The station comprises a single platform and an open-air shelter with a roof. It was built in 1999, and the property is owned by the City of Palm Springs. No services are offered at this unmanned station.

Greyhound Lines also has a stop (no ticketing) at the station.

The station was temporarily closed in May 2021 when desert sandstorms caused sand drifts near the station, making it unsafe for passengers. The station reopened on August 28, 2021.

Ridership 
Ridership at the Palm Springs station declined from 2010 to 2013, in large part due to the normally inconvenient service times to and from Los Angeles. In FY2010, the station served 6,061 passengers. This declined to 5,897 passengers in FY2011 (-2.7%), and then to 4,945 passengers in FY2012 (-16.1%). As of FY2013, Palm Springs station's ridership further declined to 3,113 passengers, corresponding to an average boarding or detraining of just 8–9 passengers daily, making Palm Springs the 71st-busiest of the 74 stations served by Amtrak in California in FY2013. Following the 2012 schedule change for the Sunset Limited and Texas Eagle, inbound trains depart  at 2:02 am (changed from 4:54am) and outbound trains arrive at 12:36 am (changed from 5:35pm).

References

External links 

 Palm Springs Amtrak station information
 Palm Springs Amtrak Station (USA Rail Guide – Train Web)
 Pictures of train station/platform
 

Buildings and structures in Palm Springs, California
Coachella Valley
Railway stations in Riverside County, California
Amtrak stations in Riverside County, California
Railway stations in the United States opened in 1997